The Vessertal-Thüringen Forest forms a central part of the much larger Thuringian forest.

In 1979, the UNESCO Biosphere Reserve Thuringian Forest was established here as the first UNESCO biosphere reserve in Germany. The biosphere protection was expanded in 1990, when the Thuringian Forest Nature Park was founded, and again in 2018. It currently covers an area of 337 km².

Vessertal-Thüringen Forest is crossed by the famous German hiking trail ‘Rennsteig’.

The biosphere 
The UNESCO Biosphere Reserve Thuringian Forest is part of Thuringian Forest Nature Park and comprises mainly large contiguous mountain spruce forests. Furthermore, beech forests, block and rock forest communities, high-elevation raised bogs can be found. Upland, low-lying and valley meadows reflect the extensive use by people for dairy cow raising. The entire biosphere reserve has been designated as Natura 2000 site and European Bird Protection Area because of black grouse (Tetrao tetrix) and black stork (Ciconia nigra) populations.

The biosphere reserve is only sparsely populated (4,200 people in the transition area in 2001). The area is also important for the protection of water resources. Activities in the transition area are agriculture, fish farming, commerce and retail, forestry, glass manufacture and crafts. Tourism is a major source of income in the region.

The major habitats & land cover types are mixed mountain forest dominated by Picea abies, Fagus sylvatica and Acer pseudoplatanus, sometimes mixed with Abies alba and Ulmus glabra; mountain clefts with Fraxinus excelsior, Acer platanoides and Alnus glutinosa; mountainous hay meadow with Trisetum flavescens, Geranium sylvaticum, Arnica montana together with several orchid species such as Coeloglossum viride and Dactylorhiza sambucina; mountain springs and streams with Phalaris arundinacea, Mimulus guttatus, Veronica beccabunga etc.; wet meadows; riverine herb communities with Filipendula ulmaria, Petasites hybridus and Chaerophyllum hirsutum; low mountain range grassland as pasture or hay pasture.

Sources

References

https://www.biosphaerenreservat-vessertal.de

Biosphere reserves of Germany
Parks in Germany